MV Hansa Stavanger was a German container ship. Owner of the Ship was Schiffahrts-Gesellschaft MS "HANSA STAVANGER" Co. KG. The Hansa Stavanger was built In 1997 at Guangzhou Wenchong Shipyard in the Chinese city of Guangzhou. Her loading capacity is 20,526 GT & she could transport 1,550 containers on board. She was captured by Somali pirates on April 4, 2009.  Around May 1, 2009,  and a screen of German Navy warships assisted approximately 200 members of the German special police unit GSG-9 in approaching the hijacked ship. During the last phase of the operation, James L. Jones, the U.S. President's National Security Advisor, withheld final approval for the operation out of concern for the safety of the 25 sailors aboard the vessel. This led the German Federal Ministry of Defence to abort the planned attack on the freighter and the GSG-9 unit returned to their base of operations at the airport of Mombasa, Kenya.

Among the captured sailors held hostage were eleven Tuvaluans and one Fijian. A ransom of $US 15 million had been demanded. The government of Tuvalu indicated it was incapable of paying, and expressed great concern for its citizens.

Whereabouts of the ship 
After hijacking, The vessel was later renamed into Pearl reflagged from Liberia to Comoros & in January 2013 renamed again into VSM & beached at Alang, India on February 13, 2013.

Literature

References

GSG 9
Maritime incidents in 2009
Piracy in Somalia
Container ships
1997 ships
Ships built in China